Edmund Schulthess (2 March 1868 – 22 April 1944) was a Swiss politician and member of the Swiss Federal Council (1912–1935).

Biography
He was born on 2 March 1868 in Villnachern to Edmund Schulthess (1826–1906) and  Cornelia Brigitta Marth (1828–1896).

He was elected to the Swiss Federal Council on 17 July 1912 and handed over office on 15 April 1935. He was affiliated to the Free Democratic Party. During his time in office he held the following departments: 
 Department of Trade, Industry and Agriculture (1912–1914)
 Department of Economic Affairs (1915–1935)

He was President of the Confederation four times in 1917, 1921, 1928 and 1933.

He died on 22 April 1944 in Bern.

Family
He married Marguerite Jeanne Disqué (born c. 1880) and had a daughter Nelly Marguerite Jeanne Schulthess, born in Switzerland on 13 August 1903. Like her parents, she married at the Church of the Holy Trinity in Bern on 30 November 1933. She and her Portuguese husband (Vasco Francisco Caetano de Castro Coutinho de Quevedo Pessanha, born in Lisbon, Coração de Jesus, on 3 July 1909) continued the family line.

External links

Edmund Schulhess in History of Social Security in Switzerland
 

1868 births
1944 deaths
People from Brugg District
Swiss Calvinist and Reformed Christians
Free Democratic Party of Switzerland politicians
Members of the Federal Council (Switzerland)
Members of the Council of States (Switzerland)
Presidents of the Organising Committees for the Olympic Games
Aargau politicians
University of Strasbourg alumni
Ludwig Maximilian University of Munich alumni
Leipzig University alumni
University of Bern alumni
University of Paris alumni